Nita Naldi (born Mary Nonna Dooley; November 13, 1894 – February 17, 1961) was an American stage performer and silent film actress. She was often cast in theatrical and screen productions as a vamp, a persona first popularized by actress Theda Bara.

Early life
Nita Naldi was born in a tenement in New York City to working class Irish parents, Julia (née Cronin) and Patrick Dooley, in 1894. Four of her siblings died in infancy, with only her younger brother, Daniel Aloysius, surviving to adulthood. 

Known in her youth as Nonna, she was named in honor of her great aunt, Mary Nonna Dunphy, a nun who in 1879 had founded Academy of the Holy Angels in Fort Lee, New Jersey. Later, in 1910, young Nonna herself attended the Catholic school, the same year her father “'left the family'”. The Academy was located directly across Linwood Avenue from Willat/Fox film studio.

Her mother's death in 1915 required Nonna to care for her two younger siblings. To support them and herself she took several jobs, including work as an artist's model and a cloak model. She soon entered vaudeville with her brother Frank, and by 1918 she  was performing as a chorus girl at the Winter Garden Theatre in The Passing Show of 1918. Her appearance in that Broadway production led to more stage jobs, and soon Naldi found herself in the Ziegfeld Follies of 1918 and 1919. It was at this time when Nonna Dooley changed her name to "Nita Naldi," which she adapted from the name of a childhood friend, Florence Rinaldi. 
Working under her new name, Naldi continued acting on Broadway; and after her well-received performance in The Bonehead, producer William A. Brady in 1920 offered her a role in his play Opportunity.

Film career

Naldi was asked to perform in a short film with Johnny Dooley, a Scottish comedian who, despite his last name, was unrelated to her. She soon quit the film, however, after realizing that Dooley had romantic intentions with another woman. Naldi was then offered a role in A Divorce of Convenience with Owen Moore. Following those two films, she had small roles in several independent films before being cast as the exotic character Gina in Paramount Pictures's 1920 release Dr. Jekyll and Mr. Hyde starring John Barrymore. Barrymore himself reportedly recommended her for the role after he “spotted” her dancing at the Winter Garden. Her noted performance in that film subsequently afforded Naldi more career opportunities. It also established her long-term friendship with Barrymore, who affectionately nicknamed her his “Dumb Duse”.

Naldi was selected by Spanish author Vicente Blasco Ibáñez for the role of Doña Sol in the film version of his novel, Blood and Sand (1922). Naldi was signed by Famous Players-Lasky for the role, and it became her first pairing with screen idol Rudolph Valentino.  The film was a major success, giving Naldi the image of a vamp, which would follow her for the rest of her life. Naldi and Valentino were never romantic, and she would be one of the few to befriend his wife Natacha Rambova, though that friendship would sour when the Valentinos divorced.

During this time, Naldi posed for famous Peruvian artist Alberto Vargas, who painted her embracing a bust of a satyr. In Vargas's original “pin-up” painting, Naldi is depicted topless, although copies of the portrait that were published and widely distributed in the 1920s, such as in the art and entertainment magazine Shadowland, were “modified” by the addition of clothing to cover her partially visible left breast.

While Valentino went on his one-man strike, which prevented him from appearing on film, Naldi took on several Famous Players-Lasky roles with growing importance, including The Ten Commandments (1923), directed by Cecil B. DeMille.  When Valentino returned and fixed his contract woes, she joined him for his final Famous Players-Lasky film, the now lost A Sainted Devil (1924).  Naldi left the company soon after.

In 1924, the Valentinos and Naldi traveled to France in order to do research for the film The Hooded Falcon. which was never made. Upon returning to California, the duo made Cobra.  The film was not well received, and Cobra became the last film in which Naldi and Valentino starred together. The Valentinos' marriage was ending around this time. After Valentino signed a contract with United Artists, he banned Rambova from the set.  She was given her own film as a consolation.  Naldi starred in Rambova's 1925 production What Price Beauty? The film suffered distribution problems, was barely noted at the time, but is noteworthy for being actress Myrna Loy's first screen appearance.

After finishing the Dorothy Gish film Clothes Make the Pirate, Naldi left for France for a short vacation, where she married J. Searle Barclay.  Despite multiple rumors that she had retired, Naldi began work on several films, including Alfred Hitchcock's second directorial effort, 1926's The Mountain Eagle. She is often mistakenly credited for appearing in Hitchcock's The Pleasure Garden.

Naldi made two films in France and one in Italy before retiring. Despite having an acceptable voice, Naldi never made a “talkie”.

Later life
Due to the financial reversals caused by her retirement from films, as well as the Great Depression, Naldi filed for bankruptcy in 1932.  She went back to the stage with Queer People and The Firebird in 1933.  The press had been critical of her weight since 1924, but reviews of her appearances in both plays were especially harsh this time around — so harsh in fact that Naldi filed suit against one paper in 1934 for $500,000. The suit was dismissed in 1938.

In 1942, Naldi was considered for For Whom the Bell Tolls but did not receive the part.  She never made another film.  That same year she began appearing in a revue in New York with Mae Murray reciting the 1897 poem "A Fool There Was." 

In 1952, she had a notable role in the play In Any Language, co-starring the legendary stage actress Uta Hagen. In 1955, she coached Carol Channing how to vamp, for Channing's new musical The Vamp. Channing would be nominated for a Tony award for Best Actress in a Musical for that role.

During the 1952 presidential election, she supported Adlai Stevenson in his campaign.

Also in the 1950s, Naldi appeared on the television series Omnibus.

Personal life

In 1929, seven years after the success of Blood and Sand, Naldi was named as a party in the divorce proceedings between 54-year-old millionaire J. Searle Barclay from his wife of 16 years. Barclay and Naldi had met during her stage career a decade earlier and had lived together with her sister in New York since 1920. The pair married in France in August 1929. Naldi, alone, returned to the United States two years later and then filed for bankruptcy in 1934. Naldi did not speak publicly about Barclay until after his death in 1945. He died penniless.

Despite Hollywood gossip and published rumors, Naldi denied ever being romantically involved with either Valentino or Barrymore. In 1956 she was also rumored to be engaged to a Park Avenue man named Larry Hall, but no union took place. Naldi had no children.

Death
Naldi spent her final years in New York City, where she died of a heart attack in her hotel room at the Wentworth Hotel on West 46th Street on February 17, 1961. She was buried in the family plot at Calvary Cemetery in  Queens, New York.

Recognition
For her contribution to the film industry, Nita Naldi was honored with a star on the Hollywood Walk of Fame at 6316 Hollywood Boulevard.

Partial filmography

 Dr. Jekyll and Mr. Hyde (1920) - Miss Gina
 The Common Sin (1920) - Warren's Mistress
 For Your Daughter's Sake (1920)
 Life (1920) - Grace Andrews
Everyman's Price (1921)
 The Last Door (1921) - The Widow
 A Divorce of Convenience (1921) - Tula Moliana
 Experience (1921) - Temptation
 The Man from Beyond (1922) - Marie Le Grande
 Reported Missing (1922) - Nita
 Channing of the Northwest (1922) - Cicily Varden
 Blood and Sand (1922) - Doña Sol
 The Snitching Hour (1922) - The 'Countess'
 Anna Ascends (1922) - Countess Rostolff
 For Your Daughter's Sake (1922, reissue of Common Sin)
 The Glimpses of the Moon (1923) - Ursula Gillow
 You Can't Fool Your Wife (1923) - Ardrita Saneck
 Lawful Larceny (1923) - Vivian Hepburn
 Hollywood (1923) - Herself
 The Ten Commandments (1923) - Sally Lung - a Eurasian
 Don't Call It Love (1923) - Rita Coventry
 The Breaking Point (1924) - Beverly Carlysle
 A Sainted Devil (1924) - Carlotta
 The Lady Who Lied (1925) - Fifi
 The Marriage Whirl (1925) - Toinette
 Clothes Make the Pirate (1925) - Madame De La Tour
 Cobra (1925) - Elise Van Zile
 What Price Beauty? (1925) - Herself
 The Miracle of Life (1926) - Helen
 The Unfair Sex (1926) - Blanchita D'Acosta
 The Mountain Eagle (1926) - Beatrice
 The Model From Montmartre (1926) - Princesse de Chabrant
 Die Pratermizzi (1927) - Valette - Tänzerin mit de Larve

References and notes

Sources
 Dooley, Mary, Certificate and Record of Birth, No. 2662, Manhattan Borough, November 13, 1894  (registered January 1895)
 1900 United States Federal Census, Manhattan, New York, New York, June 1, 1900, Enumeration District 930, Sheet 2A.
 1910 United States Federal Census, Manhattan Ward 19, New York, New York, April 15–16, 1910, Enumeration District 1043, Sheet 3B.

External links

 Nita Naldi, Silent Vamp
 

 
 Photographs and bibliography

1894 births
1961 deaths
American film actresses
American people of Irish descent
American silent film actresses
American television actresses
American stage actresses
Burials at Calvary Cemetery (Queens)
Actresses from New York City
Ziegfeld girls
20th-century American actresses
American Roman Catholics
New York (state) Democrats